Bastos is a Spanish brand of cigarettes currently owned and manufactured by Imperial Tobacco. It used to be owned by Altadis until it was taken over by Imperial Tobacco in 2008.

History 
Bastos was founded in the 1830s by the Spanish pioneer and businessman Juan Bastos (1817–1889). He was moved with his parents from his birthplace in Málaga to Oran in French Algeria the day after the French conquered the place. They were among the first Spaniards to live in Algeria at that time.

Not long after, Juan opened a tobacco shop, just as it existed back in Spain, with the intent of providing the soldiers there with snuff. His first tobacco company was called "Cigars and Cigarettes J. Bastos", which was founded in 1838 as one of the first "industrial" establishments of the new colony.

After he died in 1st of September 1889, his widow Francisca and his four children transformed the Tobacco Factory Juan Bastos into a partnership. Just before the start of the First World War, the Bastos company transformed into a Public limited company and was known as one of the first industrial enterprises in Algeria.

When Emmanuel (one of Juan's sons) died in 1920, the members of the family sold their shares, which were bought immediately by the Hoskier Bank. Eventually, a second bank, the Crédit Foncier de France would acquire almost all of the shares held by the Bastos family.

After World War II and the Algerian War, in which Algeria became independent, the Bastos house moved their operations to Cameroon, Louiseville (Canada), Bastia (France), Dakar (Senegal), Switzerland, Saigon (Vietnam) and, together with Job (another one of Juan's sons), a factory was built near Ajaccio (France).

In 1986, the local Juan Bastos Tobacco Company in Cameroon was bought out by British American Tobacco after the company could not compete in the region anymore.

Sponsorship

Grand Prix Motorcycle Racing
Bastos sponsored the Cagiva factory team during the 1986 and 1987 Grand Prix motorcycle racing season.

Markets
Bastos was or still is sold in the following countries: Netherlands, West Germany, Belgium, Luxembourg, France, Switzerland, Spain, Hungary, Madagascar and Vietnam.

In popular culture

Novels
In Captain Conan, Lieutenant Norbert (the narrator of the novel) offers some Bastos cigarettes to a Dubreuil military priest in the year following the end of World War I. The priest refuses politely, saying, "These are the cigarettes for the choir children, Lieutenant." after which he fills his pipe with tobacco.

See also

 Tobacco smoking
 Bastos racing team

References

Imperial Brands brands
Spanish brands
Cigarette brands